The Vinton Public Library is located in Vinton, Iowa, United States.

History
The community applied to the Carnegie Corporation of New York for a grant to build a public library, and on January 22, 1903, they were awarded $12,500.  It was one of 22 public libraries in Iowa that were built with Carnegie grants that year, the most in the history of the program for both the state and the country.  The Chicago architectural firm of Patton & Miller designed the Renaissance Revival building.  It features a full parapet, hipped roof with a deck, and a Flemish gable.  It was dedicated on August 25, 1904, and it has subsequently been expanded.  The building was listed on the National Register of Historic Places in 1983.

References

Library buildings completed in 1904
Buildings and structures in Benton County, Iowa
National Register of Historic Places in Benton County, Iowa
Libraries on the National Register of Historic Places in Iowa
Public libraries in Iowa
Carnegie libraries in Iowa
Renaissance Revival architecture in Iowa
Vinton, Iowa
1904 establishments in Iowa